Zavadovskiy Island, also known as Penguin Island, is an ice-covered island in the West Ice Shelf near Antarctica located at . It rises to 200 meters (656 feet) and is located 12 miles east of Mikhaylov Island.

A temporary field station named Druzhba was opened from May 20 to August 6 in 1960 on the island by the Soviet Union to study meteorological conditions.

References

Islands of Princess Elizabeth Land